Březina is a municipality and village in Mladá Boleslav District in the Central Bohemian Region of the Czech Republic. It has about 400 inhabitants.

Administrative parts
The village of Honsob is an administrative part of Březina.

Geography
It lies in the Jičín Uplands. The Jizera River forms part of the municipal border in the north.

The eastern part of the municipal territory lies in the Bohemian Paradise Protected Landscape Area. It was founded for fish farming in the 16th century and today it is an important nesting site for water birds, protected as a nature reserve.

History
The first written mention of Březina is from 1222.

Transport
The D10 motorway from Prague to Turnov passes through the municipality.

Sights
The landmark of Březina is the Church of Saint Lawrence. It was built at the turn of the 13th and 14th centuries and rebuilt in the Renaissance style in the 16th century. It is a stone church with a wooden tower floor.

References

External links

Villages in Mladá Boleslav District